Stanislau Alexandrovich Bazhkou (born 4 November 1991 in Orsha) is a Belarusian cyclist, who currently rides for Belarusian amateur team .

Major results

2009
 1st Overall Coupe du Président de la Ville de Grudziądz
2010
 4th Overall Carpathia Couriers Paths
 5th ZLM Tour
2011
 4th Time trial, National Road Championships
2012
 2nd Trofeo Banca Popolare di Vicenza
 3rd Time trial, National Road Championships
 3rd Giro del Belvedere
 3rd GP Capodarco
 5th Trofeo Alcide Degasperi
 5th Coppa della Pace
 7th Gran Premio Palio del Recioto
 7th Giro del Medio Brenta
2013
 7th Giro del Belvedere
2014
 4th Time trial, National Road Championships
2015
 1st  Mountains classification Tour of Kuban
 1st  Mountains classification Grand Prix of Adygeya
 3rd Overall Tour of China I
1st  Mountains classification
 4th Odessa Grand Prix I
 5th Overall Tour of Szeklerland
 7th Maykop–Ulyap–Maykop
 8th Odessa Grand Prix II
 9th Grand Prix of ISD
2016
 1st  Mountains classification Tour of China II
 3rd Overall Sharjah International Cycling Tour
1st  Points classification
1st Stage 3
 5th Overall Tour of China I
 7th Overall Tour of Ukraine
 8th Overall Tour of Szeklerland
 8th Overall Tour of Bulgaria
1st  Mountains classification
 9th Overall Tour of Fuzhou
1st  Mountains classification
2017
 1st  Time trial, National Road Championships
 1st Overall Tour of Mersin
1st Points classification
1st Stage 1
 La Tropicale Amissa Bongo
1st  Points classification
1st Stage 3
 1st Stage 3 Tour of Qinghai Lake
 2nd Overall Tour of Bulgaria – South
1st Mountains classification
 3rd Overall Tour of Fuzhou
1st  Mountains classification
 3rd GP Adria Mobil
 5th Overall Tour of Bulgaria – North
 6th Overall Tour of Ankara
 6th Overall Tour of Ukraine
 7th GP Laguna
2018
 1st  Road race, National Road Championships
 1st Stage 2 Five Rings of Moscow
 3rd Overall Tour of Fatih Sultan Mehmet
1st  Mountains classification
 4th Race Horizon Park Race for Peace
 8th Overall Tour of Mersin
2019
 2nd Race Horizon Park Classic
 3rd Race Horizon Park Maidan
 3rd Odessa Grand Prix
 3rd Grand Prix Velo Erciyes
 6th Tour de Ribas
 8th Chabany Race
2021
 National Road Championships
1st  Road race
2nd Time trial
 8th Grand Prix Velo Erciyes

References

External links

1991 births
Living people
Belarusian male cyclists
People from Orsha
Sportspeople from Vitebsk Region